Orthomol is a family business based in Langenfeld, North Rhine-Westphalia, Germany. It was founded by Kristian Glagau in 1991 and is now managed by his son Nils together with Michael Schmidt. Orthomol specialises in the production of over-the-counter micronutrient combinations. The effect of such supplements is a controversial subject.

History 
At the end of the 1980s, concept of using complex combinations of micronutrients, i.e. vitamins and minerals and other substances for the prevention and dietary treatment of illnesses had already established itself in the U.S. In order to bring orthomolecular medicine to Germany and Europe, Kristian Glagau and Hans Dietl founded Orthomol in 1991. The company quickly grew to about 100 employees and became one of the leading providers in the micronutrient segment. Alongside its activities in the German market, the company expanded internationally, not only in Europe, but also in Russia and the United States, as well as the Middle East and Asia.

In 2009, the founder and Managing Director of Orthomol, Kristian Glagau, passed away. The company remained in family hands and was managed by Glagau's two children together with Michael Schmidt, who had already worked as Managing Director before Glagau's death. Although most aspects of the Orthomol business strategy remained unchanged, the product range was expanded.

Group structure 
Orthomol's parent company is Orthomol Holding, a limited liability company according to German law (GmbH). It is currently managed by Nils Glagau (Sales and Marketing) and Michael Schmidt (Purchasing, Production, Logistics and Technology). The ownership structure of the group consists of two separate families, those of the founders Nils Glagau and Gesche Hugger.

Criticism 
There are several doubts concerning the effectiveness of the products produced by Orthomol and other manufacturers, which is yet to be sufficiently identified in scientific terms based on evidence-based medicine criteria. The non-academic German press has also commented negatively on the products.

Notes and references

External links 

 Official website of Orthomol

Nutritional supplement companies
Pharmaceutical companies of Germany